Twenty Paces to Death (Veinte pasos para la muerte in Spanish) is an Italian-Spanish western film of 1970 directed by Manuel Esteba and starred by Dean Reed, Alberto Farnese, Patty Shepard, Luis Induni, Marta May, Maria Pia Conte, Tony Chandler and César Ojinaga. It was written by Ignacio F. Iquino and Giuseppe Rosati, composed by Enrique Escobar and edited by Luis Puigvert and Francisco Bertuccioli.

It's produced by the company IFI Prodccuión in Spain and Admiral International Film in Italy.

Cast

References

Bibliography

External links 
 .

Films directed by Manuel Esteba
Spaghetti Western films
Films based on Spanish novels
1970 Western (genre) films
1970 films
1970s Italian films